San Lorenzo Ruiz Academy is a High School Academy founded by the Marist Brothers of the Schools in 1967. The Marist Brothers had transferred its ownership to the Mahintana Educational Association Inc. in 1967 and was renamed as Jose L. Valencia Academy and was later renamed it back to the first name of the school.

Achievements
In National Cheerleading Championship, Saints Pep Squad ranked seventh place in the over-all ranking.

References

Schools in South Cotabato
High schools in the Philippines